Tokano is a Trans–New Guinea language spoken by approximately 6,000 people in Lower Asaro Rural LLG, Eastern Highlands Province, Papua New Guinea. It is also known as Gamuso, Tokama, Yufiyufa, Zaka, Zuhozuho, and Zuhuzuho.

There are currently few publications. A collection of folk tales translated by John Guhise was produced by SIL in 1977, and there are also portions of the Bible available in Tokano.

References

External links
Open Language Archives

Kainantu–Goroka languages
Languages of Eastern Highlands Province